Associazione Calcio Milan are an Italian professional football club based in Milan, Lombardy. The club was founded as Milan Foot-Ball and Cricket Club in 1899 and has competed in the Italian football league since the following year. Milan currently play in Serie A, the top tier of Italian football. They have been out of the top tier in only two seasons since the establishment of the Serie A as the single division top tier. They have also been involved in European football ever since they became the first Italian club to enter the European Cup in 1955.

This list encompasses the major honours won by Milan, records set by the club, its managers and its players. The player records section includes details of the club's leading goalscorers and those who have made most appearances in first-team competitions. It also records notable achievements by Milan players on the international stage.

The club currently has the record for the second most Italian top-flight titles (Scudetti) with 19, tied with cross-city rivals Inter Milan and behind Juventus' 36. They also hold the record for the most European Cup victories by an Italian team, winning the competition seven times. Furthermore, in the 1991–92 season Milan became the first team to win the Serie A title without losing a single game. The club's record appearance maker is Paolo Maldini, who has made 902 official appearances between 1985 and 2009. Gunnar Nordahl is the club's record goalscorer, scoring 221 goals during his Milan career.

All figures are correct as of 23 May 2022.

Honours

Milan have won honours both domestically and in European cup competitions. They have won the Scudetto nineteen times, the Coppa Italia five times and the Supercoppa Italiana seven times. They won their first league title in their second season, winning the 1901 Italian Football Championship, while their most recent success came in 2022, when they won their 19th Scudetto. Internationally, they are the most successful Italian club, with 18 trophies which include seven UEFA Champions League titles, five UEFA Super Cups, two European Cup Winners' Cups, three Intercontinental Cups and one FIFA Club World Cup.

Domestic

League 
Italian Football Championship / Serie A (first division):
Winners (19): 1901, 1906, 1907, 1950–51, 1954–55, 1956–57, 1958–59, 1961–62, 1967–68, 1978–79, 1987–88, 1991–92, 1992–93, 1993–94, 1995–96, 1998–99, 2003–04, 2010–11, 2021–22

Runners-up (16): 1902, 1947–48, 1949–50, 1951–52, 1955–56, 1960–61, 1964–65, 1968–69, 1970–71, 1971–72, 1972–73, 1989–90, 1990–91, 2004–05, 2011–12, 2020–21

Serie B (second division):
Winners (2): 1980–81, 1982–83

Cups 
Coppa Italia:
Winners (5): 1966–67, 1971–72, 1972–73, 1976–77, 2002–03
Runners-up (9): 1941–42, 1967–68, 1970–71, 1974–75, 1984–85, 1989–90, 1997–98, 2015–16, 2017–18
Supercoppa Italiana:
Winners (7): 1988, 1992, 1993, 1994, 2004, 2011, 2016
Runners-up (5): 1996, 1999, 2003, 2018, 2022

International 
European Cup/UEFA Champions League:
Winners (7): 1962–63, 1968–69, 1988–89, 1989–90, 1993–94, 2002–03, 2006–07
Runners-up (4): 1957–58, 1992–93, 1994–95, 2004–05

European Cup Winners' Cup:
Winners (2): 1967–68, 1972–73
Runners-up (1): 1973–74

European Super Cup/UEFA Super Cup:
Winners (5): 1989, 1990, 1994, 2003, 2007
Runners-up (2): 1973, 1993

Intercontinental Cup:
Winners (3): 1969, 1989, 1990
Runners-up (4): 1963, 1993, 1994, 2003

FIFA Club World Cup:
Winners (1): 2007

Latin Cup:
Winners (2): 1951, 1956
Runners-up (1): 1953

Mitropa Cup:
Winners (1): 1982

Club records

Divisional movements

Serie A 
 Longest unbeaten run: 58 games (record across the five main European domestic leagues)
 Longest unbeaten run in away games: 38 games 
 League title won with the least amount of defeats: 0, in 1991–92 Serie A, (record shared with Juventus)
 Most away games wins in a single Serie A season: 16 (out of 19)
 Most consecutive Serie A games with at least 2 goals scored: 17
 Fewest goals conceded in home games in a single Serie A season: 2 in 15 games, in 1968-69 Serie A (record shared with Como)
 Most Serie A top scorer titles: 17

International cups 
 Most European Cups/Champions League wins without losing a game: 2, in 1988-89 and 1993-94
 Champions League winner with fewest goals conceded: 2, in 1993-94 (record shared with Aston Villa)
 Lowest ratio of goals conceded per game in a single Champions League season: 0.16 in 1993-94
 Most consecutive Champions League finals appearances: 3, from 1992-93 to 1994-95 (record shared with Juventus and Real Madrid)
 Highest goal difference win in a Champions League final: 4, in 1988-89 and 1993-94 (record shared with Real Madrid and Bayern Munich, which, however, achieved this result only once)
 First club to have won all games in a Champions League group stage (in 1992–93)
 Fewest amount of goals conceded in a Champions League group stage: 1, in 1992-93 (record shared with 10 other teams)
 Most Intercontinental Cup wins: 3, in 1969, 1989 and 1990 (record shared with Real Madrid, Boca Juniors, Peñarol and Nacional)
 Most Intercontinental Cup finals: 7, in 1963, 1969, 1989, 1990, 1993, 1994 and 2003

Matches

Firsts 
First match: Milan 2–0 SEF Mediolanum, friendly match (Medaglia del Re), 11 March 1900
First league match: Torinese 3–0 Milan, Prima Categoria, 15 April 1900
First Coppa Italia match: Milan 7–1 Rivalorese, second round, 6 January 1927
First European match: Milan 3–4 Saarbrücken, European Cup, first round, 1 November 1955

Wins 
Record win: 13–0 against Audax Modena, Prima Categoria, 4 October 1914
Record away win: 10–0 against Ausonia, Prima Categoria, 21 October 1919
Record Serie A win: 9–0 against Palermo, 18 February 1951
Record Serie A away win: 8–0 against Genoa, 5 June 1955
Record Coppa Italia win: 8–1 against Padova, 13 September 1958
Record Coppa Italia away win: 5–0 against Como, 8 June 1958
Record win in European competitions: 8–0 against Union Luxembourg, European Cup, 12 September 1962
Record away win in European competitions:
6–0 against Union Luxembourg, European Cup, 19 September 1962
6–0 against Copenhagen, Champions League, 20 October 1993
Most wins in a Serie A season: 28 (out of 38 games), during the 2005–06 season
Fewest wins in a Serie A season: 5 (out of 30 games), during the 1976–77 season

Defeats 
Record (home) defeat: 0–8 against Bologna, Prima Divisione, 5 November 1922
Record away defeat:
0–6 against Juventus, Prima Divisione, 25 October 1925
0–6 against Ajax, European Super Cup, 16 January 1974
Record-scoring defeat: 2–8 against Juventus, Divisione Nazionale, 10 July 1927
Record Serie A (away) defeat: 
 1–6 against Alessandria, 26 January 1936
 0–5 against Roma, 3 May 1998
 0–5 against Atalanta, 22 December 2019
Record Serie A home defeat: 1–6 against Juventus, 6 April 1997
Record Coppa Italia (away) defeat:
 0–5 against Fiorentina, 13 April 1940
 0–5 against Torino, 16 May 1943
Record Coppa Italia home defeat: 0–4 against Roma, 21 November 1979
Record (away) defeat in European competitions: 0–6 against Ajax, European Super Cup, 16 January 1974
Record home defeat in European competitions: 0–3 against Lille, Europa League, 5 November 2020
Most defeats in a Serie A season: 15 (out of 34 games), during the 1930–31 season
Fewest defeats in a Serie A season: unbeaten during the 34-game 1991–92 season

Goals 
Most goals scored in a Serie A season: 118 in 38 games, during the 1949–50 season
Fewest goals scored in a Serie A season: 21 in 30 games, during the 1981–82 season
Most goals conceded in a Serie A season: 62 in 34 games, during the 1932–33 season
Fewest goals conceded in a Serie A season: 12 in 30 games, during the 1968–69 season
Record for goals scored in successive Serie A matches: 38  in 2020.

Points 
Most points in a Serie A season:
Two points for a win: 60 in 38 games, during the 1950–51 season
Three points for a win:
82 in 34 games, during the 2003–04 season (league included 18 teams)
86 in 38 games, during the 2021–22 season (league included 20 teams)
Fewest points in a Serie A season:
Two points for a win: 24 in 30 games, during the 1981–82 season
Three points for a win: 43 in 34 games, during the 1996–97 season

European statistics

Player records

Trophies 
Official competitions only.

Appearances 
Paolo Maldini holds Milan's appearance record, having played 902 times over the course of 25 seasons from 1985 to 2009. He also holds the records for league and European appearances, with 647 and 168 respectively. Franco Baresi holds the record for Coppa Italia appearances with 97.

Most appearances in all competitions: Paolo Maldini, 902
Most league appearances: Paolo Maldini, 647
Most Coppa Italia appearances: Franco Baresi, 97
Most appearances in UEFA club competitions: Paolo Maldini, 174
Youngest first-team player: Gustavo Hauser, 15 years and 69 days (against U.S. Milanese, 3 March 1901)
Youngest first-team player in Serie A: Paolo Maldini, 16 years and 208 days (against Udinese, 20 January 1985)
Youngest first-team player in UEFA Champions League: Bryan Cristante, 16 years and 278 days (against Viktoria Plzeň, 6 December 2011)
Oldest first-team player: Alessandro Costacurta, 41 years and 25 days (against Udinese, 19 May 2007)
Longest-serving player: Paolo Maldini, 24 years and 132 days (from 20 January 1985 to 31 May 2009)

Most appearances 
Competitive, professional matches only. Wartime matches excluded.

Goalscorers 
Milan's all-time leading scorer is Gunnar Nordahl, who scored 221 goals for the club from 1948 to 1956. He holds the record for the most goals in a season with 38 in all competitions in the 1950–51 season. Nordahl also holds the record for the most goals in Serie A with 210; while Gianni Rivera holds the record for the most goals in the Coppa Italia, with 28. Lastly, Filippo Inzaghi holds the record for the most goals in European competition with 41.

Most goals in all competitions: Gunnar Nordahl, 221
Most league goals: Gunnar Nordahl, 210
Most Coppa Italia goals: Gianni Rivera, 28
Most international goals: Filippo Inzaghi, 43
Most goals in a season: Gunnar Nordahl, 38 (during the 1950–51 season)
Most goals in a single match: 5, Louis van Hege (four times), Aldo Cevenini (two times), Carlo Galli and Jose Altafini
Most penalties scored: Gianni Rivera, 39
Most braces scored: Gunnar Nordahl, 49
Most hat-tricks scored: Gunnar Nordahl, 18
Most games without scoring for an outfield player: Luigi Perversi, 341
Youngest goalscorer: Renzo De Vecchi, 15 years and 298 days (against Torino, 28 November 1909)
Youngest goalscorer in Serie A: Gianni Rivera, 17 years and 80 days (against Juventus, 6 November 1960)
Oldest goalscorer: Zlatan Ibrahimović, 41 years and 166 days (against Udinese, 18 March 2023)

Top goalscorers 

Competitive, professional matches only. Wartime matches excluded. Matches played (including as substitute) appear in brackets.

Milan’s Topscorers in a single Serie A season

Award winners
The following players have won the listed awards while playing for Milan.

Ballon d'Or

1969 –  Gianni Rivera 
1987 –  Ruud Gullit 
1988, 1989, 1992 –  Marco van Basten  
1995 –  George Weah
2004 –  Andriy Shevchenko 
2007 –  Kaká  

FIFA World Player of the Year

1992 –  Marco van Basten 
1995 –  George Weah 
2007 –  Kaká 

UEFA Club Footballer of the Year

2007 –  Kaká  

UEFA Best Defender of the Year (UEFA Club Football Awards)

2007 –  Paolo Maldini  

UEFA Best Midfielder of the Year (UEFA Club Football Awards)

2005 –  Kaká  
2007 –  Clarence Seedorf  

UEFA Best Forward of the Year (UEFA Club Football Awards)

2007 –  Kaká  

UEFA Best Coach of the Year (UEFA Club Football Awards)

2003 –  Carlo Ancelotti  

World Soccer Player of the Year

1987 –  Ruud Gullit
1988 –  Marco van Basten
1989 –  Ruud Gullit
1992 –  Marco van Basten
1994 –  Paolo Maldini
2007 –  Kaká

Onze d'Or

1988 –  Marco van Basten
1989 –  Marco van Basten
1995 –  George Weah
2007 –  Kaká

IFFHS World's Best Player

1988 –  Marco van Basten
1989 –  Marco van Basten

Golden Foot

2005 –  Andriy Shevchenko
2009 –  Ronaldinho

European Golden Boy

2009 –  Alexandre Pato

African Footballer of the Year

1995 –  George Weah

Serie A Footballer of the Year

2004 –  Kaká
2007 –  Kaká
2011 –  Zlatan Ibrahimović
2022 –  Rafael Leão

Serie A Foreign Footballer of the Year

2000 –  Andriy Shevchenko
2004 –  Kaká
2006 –  Kaká
2007 –  Kaká

Serie A Goalkeeper of the Year

2004 –  Dida
2020 –  Gianluigi Donnarumma
2021 –  Gianluigi Donnarumma
2022 –  Mike Maignan

Serie A Most Valuable Player

2022 –  Rafael Leão

Serie A Coach of the Year

1999 –  Alberto Zaccheroni
2004 –  Carlo Ancelotti
2011 –  Massimiliano Allegri
2022 –  Stefano Pioli

International 
First capped players: Aldo Cevenini and Pietro Lana for Italy on 15 May 1910
Most international caps while a Milan player: Paolo Maldini, 126 for Italy
First Milan player to appear at a World Cup: Pietro Arcari for Italy at 1934 FIFA World Cup
Most World Cup appearances while a Milan player: Paolo Maldini, 23 for Italy in 1990, 1994, 1998 and 2002
Most World Cup goals while a Milan player: Gianni Rivera, 3 for Italy in 1962, 1966, 1970 and 1974
First World Cup winner: Pietro Arcari in 1934 with Italy
First non-Italian player to appear in a World Cup final: Nils Liedholm with Sweden in 1958

FIFA World Cup

The following players have won the FIFA World Cup while playing for Milan:
 Pietro Arcari (Italy 1934)
 Franco Baresi (Spain 1982)
 Fulvio Collovati (Spain 1982)
 Marcel Desailly (France 1998)
 Roque Júnior (South Korea/Japan 2002)
 Gennaro Gattuso (Germany 2006)
 Alberto Gilardino (Germany 2006)
 Alessandro Nesta (Germany 2006)
 Filippo Inzaghi (Germany 2006)
 Andrea Pirlo (Germany 2006)

FIFA Confederations Cup

The following players have won the FIFA Confederations Cup while playing for Milan:
 Leonardo (Saudi Arabia 1997)
 Kaká (Germany 2005) – (South Africa 2009)
 Dida (Germany 2005)
 Alexandre Pato (South Africa 2009)

UEFA European Championship

The following players have won the UEFA European Championship while playing for Milan:
 Angelo Anquilletti (Italy 1968)
 Giovanni Lodetti (Italy 1968)
 Pierino Prati (Italy 1968)
 Gianni Rivera (Italy 1968)
 Roberto Rosato (Italy 1968)
 Ruud Gullit (West Germany 1988)
 Marco van Basten (West Germany 1988)
 Gianluigi Donnarumma (Pan–European 2020)

UEFA Nations League

The following players have won the UEFA Nations League while playing for Milan:
 Theo Hernandez (Italy 2021)
 Mike Maignan (Italy 2021)

Copa América

The following players have won the Copa América while playing for Milan:
 Lucas Paquetá (Brazil 2019)

Africa Cup of Nations

The following players have won the Africa Cup of Nations while playing for Milan:
 Fodé Ballo-Touré (Cameroon 2021)

Managerial records

Trophies 
List of managers who won at least two trophies with Milan:

Other records 
First manager: Herbert Kilpin, from 1899 to 1906
Longest-serving manager by time:
Single spell: Carlo Ancelotti, 7 years and 236 days, from 6 November 2001 to 30 June 2009
Multiple spells: Nereo Rocco, 9 years and 161 days, from 11 June 1961 to 16 June 1963 and from 17 June 1967 to 5 July 1972 as head coach; from 6 September 1972 to 10 February 1974, then from 5 October 1975 to 26 June 1976 and from 13 February 1977 to 3 July 1977 as technical director
 Most appearances in total: Nereo Rocco – 459 matches (323 as head coach and 136 as technical director) in four spells at the club between 1961 and 1977
 Most Serie A appearances: Nereo Rocco – 309 matches
 Most Coppa Italia appearances: Nereo Rocco – 67 matches
 Most UEFA competitions appearances: Carlo Ancelotti – 96 matches
 Most appearances in international competitions: Carlo Ancelotti – 98 matches
 Most wins in total: Nereo Rocco – 243 wins
 Most Serie A wins: Giuseppe Viani – 166 wins
 Most Coppa Italia wins: Nereo Rocco – 38 wins
 Most UEFA competitions wins: Carlo Ancelotti - 52 wins
 Most wins in international competitions: Carlo Ancelotti - 54 wins

Awards
 Gazzetta Sports Award as best Italian sports team of the year: 1979, 1989, 2007, 2022
 Gazzetta Sports Award as best worldwide sports team of the year: 1989
 Serie A Football Club of the Year: 2022
 IFFHS The World's Club Team of the Year: 1995, 2003
 World Soccer Men's World Team of the Year: 1989, 1994, 2003
 France Football European Team of the Year: 1989, 1990
 Laureus World Sports Award for Team of the Year (nominated): 2004, 2008
 Multiple-winner badge holder (as from 2000-01 season).

Rankings
European Cup / UEFA Champions League all-time club rankings (since 1955): 7th place
 UEFA coefficient top-ranked club by 5-year period (since 1975–1979): 2 times (2002-2006 and 2003-2007)
 Second most successful Italian club by number of trophies won: 49
 FIFA Club of the Century: 9th place
 Fourth place in the IFFHS list of the best European clubs of the 20th century.
 Fifth place in the IFFHS All-time club world ranking.
 Third place in the list of Top clubs of the 20th century by Kicker sports magazine.
 Fourth place in the top 100 clubs in the history of European competitions by L'Equipe French magazine.
 Fourth place in the top 40 clubs in the history of European competitions by the BBC.

Notes 
A.  Includes Prima Categoria, Prima Divisione, Divisione Nazionale, Serie A and Serie B (tie-breakers are not included as well).

B.  Includes UEFA Champions League, UEFA Cup Winners' Cup, UEFA Cup, and UEFA Super Cup.

C.  The "Other" column includes goals and appearances (including those as a substitute) in Supercoppa Italiana, Inter-Cities Fairs Cup, Coppa dell'Amicizia, Coppa delle Alpi, Torneo Estivo del 1986, Mitropa Cup, Latin Cup, Intercontinental Cup and FIFA Club World Cup.

D.  Home game played in Lecce.

E.  Home game played in Trieste.
N

References 
General

Specific

Milan
Statistics
Records